Daniel Fernández Torres (born April 27, 1964) is a Puerto Rican prelate of the Catholic Church who was the bishop of the Roman Catholic Diocese of Arecibo from 2010 to 2022. He spent the years 2007 to 2010 as an auxiliary bishop of the Archdiocese of San Juan.

Fernández was removed as bishop of Arecibo by Pope Francis on March 9, 2021.

Biography

Early life and career
Daniel Fernández was born into a Puerto Rican family in Chicago, Illinois, on April 27, 1964. He earned a bachelor's degree in industrial engineering at the University of Puerto Rico. He then studied at the international seminary (Colegio Eclesiástico Internacional Bidasoa) in Pamplona, Spain. From 1996 to 1998 he studied at the Pontifical Gregorian University in Rome, obtaining his Licentiate in Dogmatic Theology.

Fernández was ordained a priest by Bishop Iñaki Mallona Txertudi for the diocese of Arecibo on January 7, 1995. He then fulfilled assignments as parish vicar, bishop's representative to the council of seminaries, rector of the Seminary "Jesus Maestro", director of pastoral services for youth, dean of the Major Seminary of San Juan, and parish priest at Our Lady of Carmen Parish in Arecibo, Puerto Rico.

Auxiliary Bishop
Fernández was appointed as an auxiliary bishop for the Archdiocese of San Juan by Pope Benedict XVI on February 14, 2007. On April 27,  2007, Fernández was consecrated a bishop by Archbishop Roberto González Nieves. Bishops Txertudi and Ulises Aurelio Casiano Vargas served as his co-consecrators.

In a 2009 letter to Puerto Rico’s apostolic delegate, Archbishop Nieves recommended that Fernández be transferred to a U.S. diocese rather than become bishop of Arecibo, alleging that Fernández caused “friction” within Puerto Rico's episcopal conference, displayed "rigidity," and rarely socialized with priests of the San Juan archdiocese.

Bishop of Arecibo
Pope Benedict XVI named Fernández as bishop of the Diocese of Arecibo on September 24, 2010; he was installed there on October 3, 2010. 

In 2014, the Congregation for the Doctrine of the Faith announced that it had conducted an investigation into complaints of sexual against Fernández and dismissed the case. Fernández had said the complaints were motivated by opposition to his pursuit of priests accused on sexual abuse. By then he had removed six of his priests from active ministry. In 2014, Fernández sued unsuccessfully to deny government investigators access to additional information about cases of sexual abuse, claiming the diocese had provided sufficient detail and feared the identity of those making complaints might be revealed.

In July 2018, Cardinal Fernando Filoni, prefect of the Congregation for the Evangelization of Peoples, appointed Fernández to a five-year term as director of the Pontifical Mission Societies in Puerto Rico. Fernández refused to send seminarians from his diocese to the Interdiocesan Seminary of Puerto Rico when it was approved by the Vatican in March 2020, sending them instead to Spain.

In December 2020, Fernández wrote to Pedro Pierluisi, the incoming governor of Puerto Rico, about the problem of violence against women. Fernández said that "...gender ideology...extrapolates the class struggle from Marxism to the context family life...to convert relations between the sexes...into a struggle of sexual classes where the woman is always the oppressed, just for being a woman, and the man the oppressor, just for being a man." Fernández said the outgoing administration of Puerto Rico had waged war on religion in the name of women's liberation and he called for a rejection of the view that counts religion and the family among the social institutions to blame for the victimization of women in society.

Fernández published a statement on August 17, 2021, stating that a Catholic could have a conscientious objection to vaccination against COVID-19.  He permitted priests and deacons of his diocese to sign letters of conscientious objection if requested to do so by parishioners.Fernández refused to sign an August 24, 2021, joint statement by the other bishops of Puerto Rico that affirmed an "ethical duty to be vaccinated" against Covid-19. The statement announced the separation of the vaccinated and unvaccinated during the distribution of Communion, and advised the unvaccinated to not participate in person in other Church activities. The bishops' statement said they did "not see how a conscientious objection can be invoked from Catholic morality" against the vaccination program. 

Fernández also refused to sign a joint bishops statement on restricting the celebration of traditional forms of the Mass. At some point during the pandemic, Fernández was summoned by the Vatican to come to Rome, but he refused to go.

Removal
On October 1, 2021, Fernández received a request from Pope Francis to resign as bishop of Arecibo. On December 7, 2021, Fernández wrote to Cardinal Marc Ouellet, the prefect of the Congregation for Bishops.  Fernández wrote that "offering my resignation would be the same as declaring myself guilty of something of which I am consciously innocent, and would imply becoming an accomplice in a way of proceeding that is foreign to the Church." 

In the December letter to Ouellet, Fernández requested written confirmation of the resignation request.  He also requested a listing of the allegations against him, including breaking communion with his fellow bishops and disobedience to the pope.  Fernández declared himself innocent of all charges. He defended his statements and conduct on the COVID-19 vaccine and stated his belief that disagreement on the subject was "the touchstone that sets off all this controversy." He also stated his willingness to send his seminarians to Puerto Rico’s interdiocesan seminary if the Vatican wanted it.

On January 18, 2022, Fernández wrote to Pope Francis, offering to: "...clear up any doubts or distorted information that may have reached you" and stated that "since the first request for resignation, I have requested that the reasons for such a decision be presented to me in writing, but I have never received them." Fernández stated in his letter to Francis that he had started transferring his seminarians from Spain to the interdiocesan seminary in Puerto Rico. He expressed appreciation for the pope's willingness to receive him personally, but explained that he had not yet scheduled such a meeting because of his responsibility to care for his elderly parents.

In February 2022, Fernández wrote to Bishop Ghaleb Bader, the apostolic delegate to Puerto Rico, stating that because he had not received sufficient justification for his removal as bishop, he would not resign his see. On March 7, 2022, Fernández learned that his removal would be announced on March 9. 

On March 9, 2022, Pope Francis removed Fernández as bishop of Arecibo. The announcement by the Holy See Press Office, as is customary in such cases, provided no explanation for this action. In response, Fernández called his removal "totally unjust". He said he was told he "had not been obedient to the pope nor ... in sufficient communion with my brother bishops of Puerto Rico". He wrote: "I feel blessed for suffering persecution and slander." Fernández subsequently made several requests for a meeting with Francis, which went unanswered. 

In an interview conducted on May 19, 2022, Francis stated that the diocese of Arecibo "[had] been in conflict for years."

See also
COVID-19 pandemic in Puerto Rico
Rogelio Ricardo Livieres Plano

Notes

References

External links

 Roman Catholic Diocesis of Arecibo (Official Site in Spanish)

	
 

1964 births
Living people
Bishops appointed by Pope Benedict XVI
21st-century Roman Catholic bishops in Puerto Rico
Clergy from Chicago
Roman Catholic bishops of Puerto Rico
Roman Catholic bishops of Arecibo